The 1987 US Open was a tennis tournament played on outdoor hard courts at the USTA National Tennis Center in New York City. It was the 107th edition of the US Open and was held from September 1 to September 14, 1987. As of 2021 it is the last time any player, male or female, has won the Triple Crown as Martina Navratilova won the Women's Singles, Women's Doubles and Mixed Doubles events.

Seniors

Men's singles

 Ivan Lendl defeated  Mats Wilander 6–7(7–9), 6–0, 7–6(7–4), 6–4
 It was Lendl's 6th career Grand Slam title and his 3rd and final US Open title.

Women's singles

 Martina Navratilova defeated  Steffi Graf 7–6(7–4), 6–1
 It was Navratilova's 46th career Grand Slam title and her 11th US Open title.

Men's doubles

 Stefan Edberg /  Anders Järryd defeated  Ken Flach /  Robert Seguso 7–6(7–1), 6–2, 4–6, 5–7, 7–6(7–2)
 It was Edberg's 4th career Grand Slam title and his 1st US Open title. It was Järryd's 4th career Grand Slam title and his 1st US Open title.

Women's doubles

 Martina Navratilova /  Pam Shriver defeated  Kathy Jordan /  Elizabeth Smylie 5–7, 6–4, 6–2
 It was Navratilova's 47th career Grand Slam title and her 12th US Open title. It was Shriver's 18th career Grand Slam title and her 4th US Open title.

Mixed doubles

 Martina Navratilova /  Emilio Sánchez defeated  Betsy Nagelsen /  Paul Annacone 6–4, 6–7(6–8), 7–6(14–12)
 It was Navratilova's 48th career Grand Slam title and her 13th US Open title. It was Sánchez's 2nd career Grand Slam title and his 1st US Open title. Navratilova became only the third player in the Open Era to win the Triple Crown, winning the singles, women's doubles, and mixed doubles events at the same Grand Slam.

Juniors

Boys' singles

 David Wheaton defeated  Andrei Cherkasov 7–6, 6–0

Girls' singles

 Natasha Zvereva defeated  Sandra Birch 6–0, 6–3

Boys' doubles

 Goran Ivanišević /  Diego Nargiso defeated  Zeeshan Ali /  Brett Steven 3–6, 6–4, 6–3

Girls' doubles

 Meredith McGrath /  Kimberly Po defeated  Kim Il-soon /  Wang Shi-ting 6–4, 7–5

Prize money

Total prize money for the event was $3,979,294.

References

External links
 Official US Open website

 
 

 
US Open
US Open (tennis) by year
US Open
US Open
US Open